Albert Bollmann (5 October 1889 – 26 January 1959) was a German international footballer.

References

1889 births
1959 deaths
Association football midfielders
German footballers
Germany international footballers
Schwarz-Weiß Essen players